The 7th Hariana Lancers was a cavalry regiment in the British Indian Army. It was formed in 1846 and in 1921 was amalgamated with the 6th King Edward's Own Cavalry to form the 18th King Edward's Own Cavalry.

The unit was formed in 1846 as a regiment of Bengal irregular cavalry raised in Meerut and Cawnpore by Captain Liptrott. The regiment was raised after the First Sikh War in anticipation of the Second War starting. When the Second Sikh War broke out, they did not become involved in any engagements but found themselves in the reserve force.
In 1857 when the Indian Mutiny broke out they were stationed on the North West Frontier the regiment remained loyal and did not mutiny. As a result of the mutiny and the reconstruction of the Bengal army, the irregular cavalry regiments 8th to 16th were disbanded and the 17th became the 7th Bengal Cavalry.
They went to Burma in 1886 during the Third Anglo-Burmese War which would be their last action until the Great War.
In 1915 during World War I they were part of the forces sent to Mesopotamia and fought in the Battle of Shaiba where on 13 Apr Major Wheeler received a posthumous VC. They would lose a squadron in the actions at Kut-Al-Amara, they returned to Bolarum in October 1916. 
Like all regiments of the Indian Army, the 7th Cavalry underwent many name changes in the various reorganisations. They are listed below.
There seems to be no reason for the name chosen in the 1904 reorganisation other than a large number of the men came from that district.

In 1846  16th Irregular Cavalry
In 1847 became the 17th Irregular Cavalry
In 1861 became the 7th Regiment of Bengal Cavalry
In 1900 became the 7th Regiment of Bengal Lancers
In 1901 became the 7th Bengal Lancers
In 1903 became the 7th Lancers
In 1904 became the 7th Hariana Lancers.

In December 1919 the regiment moved to Mesopotamia, landing at Basra on 31 December. They served here until July 1920 when it returned to India, returning to its depot as Risalpur on 12 July.

Victoria Cross

One member of the 7th Hariana Lancers was awarded the Victoria Cross, Major George Godfrey Massy Wheeler.

On 12 April 1915 at Shaiba, Mesopotamia, Major Wheeler led his squadron in an attempt to capture a flag which was the centre-point of a group of the enemy who were firing on one of his troop's picquets. He advanced, attacked the enemy's infantry with the lance, and then retired while the enemy swarmed out of hidden ground where Royal Artillery guns could attack them. On 13 April Major Wheeler led his squadron to the attack of the North Mound. He was seen far ahead of his men, riding straight for the enemy's standards, but was killed in the attack.

British Indian Army cavalry regiments
Military units and formations established in 1846
Military units and formations disestablished in 1921
Honourable East India Company regiments
1846 establishments in British India